Benedito "Beni" Mambuene Mukendi (born 21 May 2002) is an Angolan footballer who plays as a midfielder for Casa Pia.

Professional career
A youth product of the Angolan club Petro de Luanda, Beni moved to Trofense in the fall of 2020. In his debut season, he helped the club win the 2020–21 and earn promotion to the Liga Portugal 2. After 2.5 seasons with Trofense and 49 appearances, he transferred to Primeira Liga side Casa Pia On 30 January 2023 on a 4-year contract.

International career
Mukendi played for the Angola U17s at the 2019 FIFA U-17 World Cup. He was called up to the senior Angola national team for the first time in March 2022.

Honours
Trofense
Campeonato de Portugal: 2020–21

References

External links
 

2002 births
Living people
Footballers from Luanda
Angolan footballers
Angola youth international footballers
C.D. Trofense players
Casa Pia A.C. players
Primeira Liga players
Liga Portugal 2 players
Campeonato de Portugal (league) players
Association football midfielders
Angolan expatriate footballers
Angolan expatriates in Portugal
Expatriate footballers in Portugal